

Luftflotte 2 (Air Fleet 2) was one of the primary divisions of the German Luftwaffe in World War II. It was formed 1 February 1939 in Braunschweig and transferred to Italy on 15 November 1941. The Luftflotte was disbanded on 27 September 1944.

Commanding officers
 General Hellmuth Felmy, 1 February 1939 – 12 January 1940
 Generalfeldmarschall Albert Kesselring, 12 January 1940 – 11 June 1943
 Generalfeldmarschall Wolfram Freiherr von Richthofen, 12 June 1943 – 27 September 1944

Chief of staff
 Oberst Josef Kammhuber, 1 October 1939 – 19 December 1939
 Generalmajor Wilhelm Speidel, 19 December 1939 – 30 January 1940
 Oberst Gerhard Bassenge, 30 January 1940 – 31 July 1940
 Oberst Hans Seidemann, 5 October 1940 – 11 August 1942
 Generalmajor Paul Deichmann, 25 August 1942 – 25 June 1943
 Generalleutnant Ernst Müller, 1 October 1943 – September 1944

Subordinated units

References
Notes

References
 Luftflotte 2 @ Lexikon der Wehrmacht
 Luftflotte 2 @ The Luftwaffe, 1933-45

German Air Fleets in World War II
Military units and formations established in 1939
Military units and formations disestablished in 1944